In the mathematical area of graph theory, the Mycielskian or Mycielski graph of an undirected graph is a larger graph formed from it by a construction of . The construction preserves the property of being triangle-free but increases the chromatic number; by applying the construction repeatedly to a triangle-free starting graph, Mycielski showed that there exist triangle-free graphs with arbitrarily large chromatic number.

Construction

Let the n vertices of the given graph G be v1, v2, . . . , vn. The Mycielski graph μ(G) contains G itself as a subgraph, together with n+1 additional vertices: a vertex ui corresponding to each vertex vi of G, and an extra vertex w.  Each vertex ui is connected by an edge to w, so that these vertices form a subgraph in the form of a star K1,n. In addition, for each edge vivj of G, the Mycielski graph includes two edges, uivj and viuj.

Thus, if G has n vertices and m edges, μ(G) has 2n+1 vertices and 3m+n edges. 

The only new triangles in μ(G) are of the form vivjuk, where vivjvk is a triangle  in G. Thus, if G is triangle-free, so is μ(G).

If we had  for all i, then we could define a proper (k−1)-coloring of G by  when  , and  otherwise. That is, .

Iterated Mycielskians

Applying the Mycielskian repeatedly, starting with the one-edge graph, produces a sequence of graphs Mi = μ(Mi−1), sometimes called the Mycielski graphs. The first few graphs in this sequence are the graph M2 = K2 with two vertices connected by an edge, the cycle graph M3 = C5, and the Grötzsch graph M4 with 11 vertices and 20 edges.

In general, the graph Mi is triangle-free, (i−1)-vertex-connected, and i-chromatic. The number of vertices in Mi for i ≥ 2 is 3 × 2i−2 − 1 , while the number of edges for i = 2, 3, . . . is:

 1, 5, 20, 71, 236, 755, 2360, 7271, 22196, 67355, ... .

Properties

If G has chromatic number k, then μ(G) has chromatic number k + 1 .
If G is triangle-free, then so is μ(G) .
More generally, if G has clique number ω(G), then μ(G) has clique number max(2,ω(G)) .
If G is a factor-critical graph, then so is μ(G) . In particular, every graph Mi for i ≥ 2 is factor-critical.
If G has a Hamiltonian cycle, then so does μ(G) .
If G has domination number γ(G), then μ(G) has domination number γ(G)+1 .

Cones over graphs

In this construction, one forms a graph  from a given graph G by taking the tensor product G × H, where H is a path of length i with a self-loop at one end, and then collapsing into a single supervertex all of the vertices associated with the vertex of H at the non-loop end of the path. The Mycielskian itself can be formed in this way as μ(G) = Δ2(G).

While the cone construction does not always increase the chromatic number,  proved that it does so when applied iteratively to K2. That is, define a sequence of families of graphs, called generalized Mycielskians, as
 ℳ(2) = {K2} and ℳ(k+1) = { | G ∈ ℳ(k), i ∈ }.
For example, ℳ(3) is the family of odd cycles. Then each graph in ℳ(k) is k-chromatic. The proof uses methods of topological combinatorics developed by László Lovász to compute the chromatic number of Kneser graphs.
The triangle-free property is then strengthened as follows: if one only applies the cone construction Δi for i ≥ r, then the resulting graph has odd girth at least 2r + 1, that is, it contains no odd cycles of length less than 2r + 1.
Thus generalized Mycielskians provide a simple construction of graphs with high chromatic number and high odd girth.

References 
.
.
.
.
.
.
.

External links

Graph operations